Karina Fabian (born 1967) is a Catholic American writer of fantasy, science fiction, comedic horror, and devotionals. She is also known for her involvement in writing communities, including founding the Catholic Writers Conference Online and teaching at various free workshops, such as the MuseOnline Conference. She promotes Catholic writing through the founding of the Catholic Writers' Guild, an international online organization of Catholic writers, editors and illustrators.

Early life
Karina (Lumbert) Fabian was born to Steven Lumbert, a Colorado State Patrolman, and Socorro Lumbert, a social worker for the developmentally disabled. She grew up in Pueblo, Colorado, and graduated Valedictorian from South High School in 1985. Fabian then attended Colorado State University in Ft. Collins, Colorado, on a four-year Air Force Scholarship, where she majored in Math and minored in History. She graduated with university honors and received a commission in the US Air Force.
Her first assignment was to Signals Intelligence Training in San Angelo, Texas, where she met her future husband, Robert Fabian, a first lieutenant at El Dorado Missile Warning station.

Karina began her writing career in earnest in the summer of 1995, taking on writing jobs with the Diocese of Wyoming, and working freelance for nonfiction magazines. She primarily freelanced, writing about pregnancy, parenting, and homeschooling until 2007 when she shifted her focus to fiction writing.

Career

Karina Fabian has written in various genres, such as devotionals and satirical horror. Fabian enjoys adding established religion and faith in her fantasy and science fiction, saying that this stems from her being a character-driven writer. She has said that religion is a part of the human condition and thus should be a natural part of a character's life and thus, a part of fiction. She has criticized books that put preaching above plot and character.

In 2010, Fabian was given the opportunity to write a small devotional. She recruited her father, Deacon Steven Lumbert, to write it with her. Why God Matters: How to Recognize Him in Daily Life contains short stories from their own faith lives, plus suggestions for contemplation and prayer, Bible quotes and the Catechism of the Catholic Church.

Founder of the Catholic Writers' Guild
Fabian is one of the founding members of the Catholic Writers' Guild, an American-based but international organization of Catholic writers, editors and illustrators, officially established in 2009. She served as president for the first four of its founding years, then as an officer. In addition, she and author Ann Lewis created online and live writers conferences, sponsored by the Guild. The online conference, which takes place each spring, offers dozens of workshops and chats on writing and faith, as well as pitch sessions. The Guild also has programs for evaluating the Catholic content of books (The CWG Seal of Approval) and for excellence in Catholic Writing (the Catholic Arts and Letters Award).

Awards
Karina Fabian has won numerous awards for her works:
 2007 EPPIE Finalist (best anthology): Leaps of Faith
 2009 EPPIE Winner (best science fiction): Infinite Space, Infinite God
 2009 Mensa International Owl (best fiction): World Gathering: Magic, Mensa and Mayhem 
 2010 Next Generation Indie Book Awards Winner (best fantasy): Magic, Mensa and Mayhem

Bibliography
 Magic, Mensa and Mayhem (2009, Swimming Kangaroo Books)
 Infinite Space, Infinite God I and II (2007 and 2010, Twilight Times)
 Leaps of Faith (2008, The Writers' Café Press)
 Neeta Lyffe, Zombie Exterminator (2010, Damnation Books)
 Why God Matters: How to Recognize Him in Daily Life (2010, Tribute Books)
 A Little Flower's Craft Companion Wreath I and A Little Flower's Craft Companion Wreath II and III, and the Blue Knights Craft Companion (EcceHomo Press)

References

External links

Catholic Writers' Guild

1967 births
21st-century American novelists
American horror writers
American science fiction writers
Living people
Women science fiction and fantasy writers
Women horror writers
American women novelists
Mensans
21st-century American women writers